Garrabrant Ryerson Alyea  (born December 8, 1940) is an American former professional baseball outfielder. He played in Major League Baseball (MLB) for the Washington Senators, Minnesota Twins, Oakland Athletics, and St. Louis Cardinals. In 1965, he became the ninth player to hit a home run on his first MLB pitch.

Born in Passaic, New Jersey, Alyea grew up in Rutherford, New Jersey and graduated from Rutherford High School, where he played basketball and quarterbacked the football team, in addition to baseball.

Originally signed by the Cincinnati Reds, Alyea was drafted a year later by the Washington Senators.

Alyea made his major league debut on September 12, 1965. Called to the plate as a pinch hitter, he hit a home run off Los Angeles Angels pitcher Rudy May on the first pitch he saw in the Majors.

His most productive season came in 1970 for the Minnesota Twins, when he posted career numbers in batting average (.291) home runs (16) and runs batted in (61), including seven-RBI games on April 7 (Opening Day) and September 7.

Alyea was sent to the Texas Rangers on December 1, 1972, completing a trade from 33 days prior on October 30 involving the Oakland Athletics acquiring Paul Lindblad for Bill McNulty.

In between, Alyea played winter ball for the Cardenales de Lara, Tiburones de La Guaira and Tigres de Aragua clubs of the Venezuelan Professional Baseball League, leading the circuit in home runs in 1968 (17) and 1971 (12), and for RBI in 1971 (36). In addition, he played with the VPBL champion Tigres in the 1972 Caribbean Series.

After his baseball playing days were over, Alyea oversaw the crap tables at the Tropicana Casino & Resort in Atlantic City, New Jersey.

See also
Home run in first Major League at-bat

References

External links

1940 births
Living people
Baseball players from New Jersey
Buffalo Bisons (minor league) players
Cardenales de Lara players
American expatriate baseball players in Venezuela
Florida Instructional League Senators players
Geneva Redlegs players
Hawaii Islanders players
Hofstra Pride baseball players
Iowa Oaks players
Major League Baseball outfielders
Minnesota Twins players
Montgomery Rebels players
Oakland Athletics players
Pawtucket Red Sox players
Peninsula Senators players
Rutherford High School (New Jersey) alumni
Sportspeople from Passaic, New Jersey
People from Rutherford, New Jersey
Sportspeople from Bergen County, New Jersey
St. Louis Cardinals players
Tiburones de La Guaira players
Tigres de Aragua players
Washington Senators (1961–1971) players
York White Roses players